Pasargadae (from Old Persian Pāθra-gadā, "protective club" or "strong club"; Modern Persian:  Pāsārgād) was the capital of the Achaemenid Empire under Cyrus the Great (559–530 BC), who ordered its construction and the location of his tomb.

History

Pasargadae was founded in the 6th century BCE as the first capital of the Achaemenid Empire by Cyrus the Great, near the site of his victory over the Median king Astyages in 550 BCE. The city remained the Achaemenid capital until Darius moved it to Persepolis.

The archaeological site covers 1.6 square kilometers and includes a structure commonly believed to be the mausoleum of Cyrus, the fortress of Toll-e Takht sitting on top of a nearby hill, and the remains of two royal palaces and gardens. Pasargadae Persian Gardens provide the earliest known example of the Persian chahar bagh, or fourfold garden design (see Persian Gardens).

The remains of the tomb of Cyrus' son and successor Cambyses II have been found in Pasargadae, near the fortress of Toll-e Takht, and identified in 2006.

The Gate R, located at the eastern edge of the palace area, is the oldest known freestanding propylaeum. It may have been the architectural predecessor of the Gate of All Nations at Persepolis.

Tomb of Cyrus the Great

The most important monument in Pasargadae is the tomb of Cyrus the Great. It has six broad steps leading to the sepulchre, the chamber of which measures 3.17 m long by 2.11 m wide by 2.11 m high and has a low and narrow entrance.  Though there is no firm evidence identifying the tomb as that of Cyrus, Greek historians say that Alexander believed it was.  When Alexander looted and destroyed Persepolis, he paid a visit to the tomb of Cyrus. Arrian, writing in the second century CE, recorded that Alexander commanded Aristobulus, one of his warriors, to enter the monument.  Inside he found a golden bed, a table set with drinking vessels, a gold coffin, some ornaments studded with precious stones and an inscription on the tomb. No trace of any such inscription survives, and there is considerable disagreement to the exact wording of the text. Strabo and Arrian report that it read:

The design of Cyrus' tomb is credited to Mesopotamian or Elamite ziggurats, but the cella is usually attributed to Urartu tombs of an earlier period. In particular, the tomb at Pasargadae has almost exactly the same dimensions as the tomb of Alyattes, father of the Lydian King Croesus; however, some have refused the claim (according to Herodotus, Croesus was spared by Cyrus during the conquest of Lydia, and became a member of Cyrus' court).  The main decoration on the tomb is a rosette design over the door within the gable. In general, the art and architecture found at Pasargadae exemplified the Persian synthesis of various traditions, drawing on precedents from Elam, Babylon, Assyria, and ancient Egypt, with the addition of some Anatolian influences.

Archaeology

The first capital of the Achaemenid Empire, Pasargadae lies in ruins 40 kilometers from Persepolis, in present-day Fars province of Iran.

Pasargadae was first archaeologically explored by the German archaeologist Ernst Herzfeld in 1905, and in one excavation season in 1928, together with his assistant .  Since 1946, the original documents, notebooks, photographs, fragments of wall paintings and pottery from the early excavations are preserved in the Freer Gallery of Art, Smithsonian Institution, in Washington, DC.  After Herzfeld, Sir Aurel Stein completed a site plan for Pasargadae in 1934.  In 1935, Erich F. Schmidt produced a series of aerial photographs of the entire complex.

From 1949 to 1955, an Iranian team led by Ali Sami worked there.  A British Institute of Persian Studies team led by David Stronach resumed excavation from 1961 to 1963. It was during the 1960s that a pot-hoard known as the Pasargadae Treasure was excavated near the foundations of 'Pavilion B' at the site. Dating to the 5th-4th centuries BC, the treasure consists of ornate Achaemenid jewellery made from gold and precious gems and is now housed in the National Museum of Iran and the British Museum. It has been suggested that the treasure was buried as a subsequent action once Alexander the Great approached with his army, then remained buried, hinting at violence.

After a gap, work was resumed by the Iranian Cultural Heritage Organization and the Maison de l'Orient et de la Méditerranée of the University of Lyon in 2000.  The complex is one of the key cultural heritage sites for tourism in Iran.

Sivand Dam controversy
There has been growing concern regarding the proposed Sivand Dam, named after the nearby town of Sivand.  Despite planning that has stretched over 10 years, Iran's own Iranian Cultural Heritage Organization was not aware of the broader areas of flooding during much of this time.

Its placement between both the ruins of Pasargadae and Persepolis has many archaeologists and Iranians worried that the dam will flood these UNESCO World Heritage sites, although scientists involved with the construction say this is not obvious because the sites sit above the planned waterline.  Of the two sites, Pasargadae is the one considered to be more threatened. Experts agree that the planning of future dam projects in Iran will merit an earlier examination of the risks to cultural resource properties.

Of broadly shared concern to archaeologists is the effect of the increase in humidity caused by the lake.  All agree that the humidity created by it will speed up the destruction of Pasargadae, yet experts from the Ministry of Energy believe it could be partially compensated for by controlling the water level of the reservoir.

Construction of the dam began 19 April 2007, with the height of the waterline limited so as to mitigate damage to the ruins.

In popular culture

In 1930, the Brazilian poet Manuel Bandeira published a poem called "Vou-me embora pra Pasárgada" ("I'm off to Pasargadae" in Portuguese), in a book entitled Libertinagem.  It tells the story of a man who wants to go to Pasargadae, described in the poem as a utopian city, having the children learned in the school about this "utopic city created by Manuel Bandeira". Manuel Bandeira heard the name Pasargadae for the first time when he was 16 years old, reading a book by a Greek author. The name of the field of the Persians reminded him of good things, of a place of tranquillity and beauties. Years later, in his apartment, during a moment of sadness and anxiety, he had the idea of “vou-me embora pra Pasárgada” (I'm off to Pasargadae) and then created the poem, which surrounds the great part of the Brazilian population’s imagination to this day. 
The following is an extract, in the original then in a translation:

Vou‐me embora pra Pasárgada

Vou-me embora pra Pasárgada
Lá sou amigo do rei
Lá tenho a mulher que eu quero
Na cama que escolherei

[…]

E quando eu estiver mais triste
Mas triste de não ter jeito
Quando de noite me der
Vontade de me matar
— Lá sou amigo do rei —
Terei a mulher que eu quero
Na cama que escolherei
Vou-me embora pra Pasárgada.

I'm off to Pasargadae

I'm off to Pasargadae
There I am friends with the king
There I shall have the woman I want
In the bed of my choice

[…]

And when I'm sadder
So sad there's nothing left
When at night I feel
A desire to kill myself
— There I am friends with the king —
I will have the woman I want
On the bed of my choice
I'm off to Pasargadae.

Gallery

See also
 2,500 year celebration of Iran's monarchy
 Achaemenid architecture
 Cities of the ancient Near East
 History of Iran
 Iranian architecture
 Tang-e Bolaghi
 Ka'ba-ye Zartosht, modeled after the "Prison of Solomon"

References

Bibliography

 .
 .
 .
 .
 . 
 .
 Ali Mozaffari, World Heritage in Iran: Perspectives on Pasargadae, Routledge, 2016,

External links

Excavation Documentation and Fragments of Wall Paintings from Pasargadae
 .
 .
 .
 .
 .
Pasargadae - Livius
 

Populated places established in the 6th century BC
Buildings and structures completed in the 6th century BC
Archaeological sites in Iran
World Heritage Sites in Iran
Architecture in Iran
Persian gardens in Iran
Achaemenid cities
Archaeology of the Achaemenid Empire
Former populated places in Iran
Buildings and structures in Fars Province
Artifacts in the collection of the Smithsonian Institution
Cyrus the Great
Tourist attractions in Fars Province
National works of Iran